The Men's 85  kg weightlifting event is a medal event at 2014 Commonwealth Games, limiting competitors to a maximum of 85 kilograms of body mass. The competition took  place on 28 July  at the Clyde Auditorium , Glasgow.

Result

References

Weightlifting at the 2014 Commonwealth Games